This is a list of events from British radio in 1927.

Events
1 January – The British Broadcasting Company is succeeded in monopoly control of the airwaves by the British Broadcasting Corporation, under the terms of a Royal Charter. John Reith becomes the first Director-General.
15 January – First live sports broadcast on the BBC: the rugby union international England v Wales is commented on by Teddy Wakelam.
22 January – The BBC transmits the first ever running commentary on an English Football League match: Arsenal v. Sheffield United at Highbury.
7 July – Christopher Stone presents a record programme on the BBC, becoming the first British disc jockey.
13 August – The Proms broadcast concert season opens in London under management of the BBC.
21 August – The BBC starts high-power medium-wave transmissions to the English Midlands from station 5GB (Daventry transmitting station) on 610 kHz.
December – Joshua Powell of Clacton begins the domestic radio relay service which will become Rediffusion.
Vernon Bartlett is appointed the BBC's first foreign correspondent.
Entertainers Elsie and Doris Waters make their first radio appearance on the BBC.

Births
26 February – Gerald Priestland, news correspondent (died 1991)
25 June – Peter Clayton, jazz disc jockey (died 1991)
20 July – Heather Chasen, actress (died 2020)
9 November – Ken Dodd, comedian (died 2018)
9 December – Benny Green, jazz saxophonist and radio presenter (died 1998)
17 December – Robert Robinson, broadcast presenter (died 2011)

References 

 
Years in British radio
Radio